Mohammad Reza Samadi Kalkhoran (born 1 January 1971) is a retired amateur boxer from Iran, who competed in the 1996 Summer Olympics in the Super heavyweight (+91 kg) division and lost in the first round to Duncan Dokiwari of Nigeria. He is also a two time Asian Games silver medalist.

References

External links
 

1971 births
Living people
Iranian male boxers
Olympic boxers of Iran
Boxers at the 1996 Summer Olympics
Asian Games silver medalists for Iran
Asian Games medalists in boxing
Boxers at the 1994 Asian Games
Boxers at the 1998 Asian Games
Medalists at the 1994 Asian Games
Medalists at the 1998 Asian Games
Super-heavyweight boxers
21st-century Iranian people
20th-century Iranian people